KCCE-LP was a low-power television station in San Luis Obispo, California, broadcasting locally on channel 50 as an affiliate of America One. Founded April 16, 1992, the station was owned by Anet Communications.

The station's license was cancelled by the Federal Communications Commission on January 4, 2010.

External links

CCE-LP
Television channels and stations established in 1992
Defunct television stations in the United States
Television channels and stations disestablished in 2010
1992 establishments in California
2010 disestablishments in California
CCE-LP